Pа́tskаu  — khutor in Belarus, in Brahin Raion of Gomel Region. Was included in Malojinsky selsoviet.

Patskov was excluded from the list of settlements according to decision of Gomelsky oblast government dated of 17 November 2005  № 793.

References

Gomel Region